DZBM (105.1 FM) is a radio station owned by Mareco Broadcasting Network and operated by Horizon of the Sun Communications, serving as a relay station of Q Radio 105.1 in Manila. The station's transmitter is located at The Country Place complex, Dominican Hill Rd., Baguio.

References

External links
Q Radio FB Page
Q Radio Website

Radio stations in Baguio
Radio stations established in 1999